Waimahaka is a locality in the Southland region of New Zealand's South Island.  It is situated in a rural area, inland from Toetoes Bay.  Nearby settlements include Pine Bush and Titiroa to the northwest, Fortification and Te Peka to the east, Pukewao and Tokanui to the southwest, and Fortrose on the coast to the south.

Railway 

On 18 June 1899, an extension of the Seaward Bush Branch was opened from Gorge Road to Waimahaka.  This branch line railway linked Waimahaka with Invercargill, and an engine shed, locomotive turntable, and goods shed were established at the Waimahaka station.  The opening of the railway allowed Waimahaka to develop at the expense of Fortrose, as the railway provided quicker transport to Invercargill than the vessels that called at Fortrose's small port.  On 20 December 1911, the railway was extended to Tokanui and Waimahaka's engine facilities were transferred there.

Passengers and freight were carried together on mixed trains that ran daily to and from Invercargill.  In 1951, these were cut to operate just once per week, mainly for the benefit of families employed by the Railways Department who lived in the area; goods-only trains operated on other days.  On 1 June 1960, passenger services were fully cancelled and trains through Waimahaka catered solely for freight until the line officially closed on 31 March 1966 as freight levels had not been profitable for years.  The station platform and loading bank remain identifiable, and the goods shed has been refurbished for other uses.  Some of the line's old formation can still be seen in the vicinity of Waimahaka.

Education 

Waimahaka has a small primary school.  Named Waimahaka School, it had sixteen students on its roll as of 2007.
The school is well resourced with netball courts, a rugby field, and a covered swimming pool, heated with solar panels. The library is extensive boasting over 3,000 books. The classroom has an interactive whiteboard and a computer for every child. The school has fast high-speed wireless internet.
ERO has visited recently and given the school a good report.

References 

Populated places in Southland, New Zealand
The Catlins
Southland District